Vear is a surname. Notable people with the surname include:

 Brian Vear (1937–2008), Australian rower
 John Vear (1938–2017), New Zealand cricketer
 Percy Vear (1911–1983), English boxer
 Steve Vear (born 1952), American politician